German Sign Language or Deutsche Gebärdensprache (DGS), is the sign language of the deaf community in Germany, Luxembourg and in the German-speaking community of Belgium. It is unclear how many use German Sign Language as their main language; Gallaudet University estimated 50,000 as of 1986.
The language has evolved through use in deaf communities over hundreds of years.

Recognition
Germany has a strong oralist tradition and historically has seen a suppression of sign language. German Sign Language was first legally recognised in The Federal Disability Equality Act (2002)  in May 2002. Since then, deaf people have a legal entitlement to Sign Language interpreters when communicating with federal authorities, free of charge.

Very few television programs include an interpreter; those that do are the news and a news "round-up". There is at least one programme conducted entirely in German Sign Language called Sehen statt Hören (Seeing Instead of Hearing), a documentary-style programme produced by the Bayerischer Rundfunk (BR) and broadcast on Saturday mornings on Bayerischer Rundfunk and the other regional state broadcasters in Germany.

In 2018, the Luxembourgish Chamber of Deputies voted unanimously to recognise German Sign Language.

German and German Sign Language
German Sign Language is unrelated to spoken German. While spoken German builds sentences following a subject – verb – object pattern, German Sign Language uses a subject object verb strategy. Thus, the two have very different grammars, though as the dominant language of the region, German has had some influence on German Sign Language. A signed system that follows German grammar, Signed German (Lautsprachbegleitende Gebärden or Lautbegleitende Gebärden, "sound-accompanying signs"), is used in education. It is not used as a natural means of communication between deaf people.  Another system of manually representing German is cued speech, known as Phonembestimmes Manualsystem (Phonemic Manual System).

Manual  and fingerspelling

German Sign Language uses a one-handed manual alphabet ('Fingeralphabet' in German) derived from the French manual alphabet of the 18th century; it is related to manual alphabets used across Europe and in North America. It differs from the ASL manual alphabet in the shape of the letter T and in the addition of a letter SCH (a 'five' hand). The additional letters for Ä, Ö, Ü, and ß are formed by moving the letters for A, O, U, and S a short distance downwards.

Dialects and related languages

Regional variants of German Sign Language include Hamburg, Berlin, and Munich sign. Sign languages of regions in the former East Germany have a greater divergence from sign languages of the western regions; some may be unrelated. Polish Sign Language is descended from German Sign Language. Israeli Sign Language may be as well, as it evolved from the sign language used by German Jewish teachers who opened a school for deaf children in Jerusalem in 1932, and still shows some resemblance to its German counterpart. It is not related to Austrian Sign Language, which is used in parts of southern Germany, nor to Swiss Sign Language, both of which are part of the French Sign Language family, though they have had some influence from German Sign Language.

Notation systems
Everyday users of German Sign Language use no written form of the language. In academic contexts, German Sign Language is usually described with the Hamburg notation system or HamNoSys. SignWriting also has its adherents in Germany.

Grammar
The grammar of German Sign Language may be described in terms of the conventional linguistic categories phonology, morphology, morphosyntax and syntax.

Phonology

Signs are made up of a combination of different elements from each of the classes of distinctive features: handshape, hand orientation, location and movement. If one of these elements is changed, it can result in a sign with a completely different meaning. Two signs differing in only one element are deemed to be a minimal pair. German Sign Language uses 32 handshapes, of which six are basic handshapes found in all sign languages.

Two-handed signs are signs which are necessarily performed with both hands. Their formation is in accordance with certain phonotactic limitations, such as the rule of symmetry (when both hands move at the same time, they have the same handshape) and the rule of dominance (if the two hands have different handshapes, only the dominant hand is moved while the non-dominant hand remains passive).

Uninflected lexical signs in German Sign Language have at most two syllables. Syllables consist of two syllabic positions, described as Hold (H) and Movement (M). Holds consist of the handshape together with the hand orientation (together referred to as the hand configuration) at a specific location in signing space. Holds do not contain any change of location (movement from one location to another). Movements, on the other hand, involve a change of location and may involve secondary movements such as wiggling of the fingers. Syllables may then be grouped into the following types: M (the minimal syllable), HM, MH, HMH (the maximal syllable). In the case of HM syllables, for example, the hand configuration of the  Movement moves away from the location of the Hold. A syllable of type M can consist of the following specifications: a path movement (from one location to another), a path movement with secondary movement (such as wiggling or twisting), or a secondary movement without path movement. The syllable type H (a segment without a Movement) is not allowed for phonotactical reasons.

An elementary component of lexical signs are non-manual lexical markings, such as movements of eyes (rolling, widening), mouth (puffing, rounding) and face, as well as the whole head (nodding, tilting) and upper body (leaning). These are obligatory accompaniments of a quarter of all lexical signs. Making visual syllables with the mouth is referred to as mouthing.

Syntax

Clause structure

Unmarked word order 

The unmarked word order in DGS is subject-object-verb, similar to languages such as Turkish, Japanese and Latin, but differing from German.

If an indirect object appears in the sentence, it stands before the direct object.

In sentences with chains of verbs, auxiliary verbs and similar usually appear after the full verb, the opposite of English word order.

The Personal Agreement Marker (glossed as "PAM"), which looks almost like the sign for "person" and may be accompanied by the mouthing "auf" ("on"), is a sign used to indicate the location in signing space of animate objects when the verb in the sentence does not do this. It roughly fills the roll of object pronouns, however it seems to function more as an auxiliary verb, inflecting for person where the main verb does not. Although there is considerable variation, especially across dialects, it tends to occur where auxiliaries occur, after the verb, rather than in the object slot. The benefactive marker (glossed as "BEM") is similarly placed.

Time expressions (tomorrow, next week) appear at the beginning of the sentence (as a discourse topic).

Phrases specifying location tend to occur at the beginning of the sentence (after the time information).

This follows the figure-ground-principle, according to which smaller, more mobile referents (figures) tend to occur after larger, less mobile referents (ground).

Sentence adverbs often appear at the beginning of the sentence.

However, adverbs that modify the verb but which cannot be expressed non-manually follow the verb as an extra clause.

Wh-words (interrogatives) usually occur at the end of the sentence after the verb.

Some signs with a negative meaning tend to occur at the end of the sentence.

However, if the negation is not emphasised, it can also appear in the expected position.

Determiners (articles, demonstratives, quantifiers, relative pronouns) follow the noun.

Their function is to set the location of referents within the signing space. If this is indicated instead by directional verbs, determiners can always be omitted, provided they are not required for other reasons (such as showing possession, pluralisation, etc.) There is no distinction between definite and indefinite articles.

Attributive adjectives follow immediately after the noun.

The copula to be does not exist in DGS. Predicative adjectives are generally separated from the noun by a  determiner.

Compare the preceding sentence to the following noun phrase, in which the determiner follows the adjective.

Possessive adjectives stand between the possessor and the possession.

Here is an example of a longer but nevertheless simple, unmarked sentence.

Marked sentences 

Parts of the sentence which are moved outside of their usual unmarked position are accompanied by non-manual marking.

Sentence elements (with the exception of verbs) can be topicalised by being moved to the beginning of the sentence and marked with raised eyebrows.

Often, a topic doesn't otherwise have any other role in the sentence. In these cases, it represents a limitation of the scope of the sentence. Compare the following three sentences.

References

Further reading
 "German Sign Language Dictionary" – Maisch, Günther, and Fritz-H. Wisch (1987–89). Gebärden-Lexikon. Hamburg: Verlag hörgeschädigter Kinder.
 "German Sign Language" Rammel, Georg (1974). Die Gebärdensprache: Versuch einer Wesenanalyse. Berlin-Charlottenburg: Marhold.
 "Signed German" Hogger, Birgit (1991). Linguistische Überlegungen zur lautsprachbegleitenden Gebärdung. Hörgeschädigtenpädagogik, v.45 no.4, p. 234-237
 Daniela Happ, Marc-Oliver Vorköper: Deutsche Gebärdensprache : Ein Lehr- und Arbeitsbuch. Fachhochschulverlag, Frankfurt am Main 2006, 
 Helen Leuninger: Gebärdensprachen : Struktur, Erwerb, Verwendung. Buske, Hamburg 2005,

External links
 Deaf and Sign Language Research Team Aachen – DESIRE (Aachen) 
 Full list of online DGS dictionaries (Internet Archive copy, 26 Aug 2008)
 Institute of German Sign Language and Communication of the Deaf 
 Rheinisch-Westfälischen Technischen Hochschule Aachen (RWTH Aachen University of Technology) 
 Website of the German National Association of the Deaf 

German Sign Language family
Languages of Germany
Languages of Belgium
Deafness in Germany